The Act to Provide a Naval Armament (Sess. 1, ch. 12), also known as the Naval Act of 1794, or simply, the Naval Act, was passed by the 3rd United States Congress on March 27, 1794, and signed into law by President George Washington. The act authorized the construction of six frigates at a total cost of $688,888.82. These ships were the first ships of what eventually became the present-day United States Navy.

Purpose
In August 1785, after the Revolutionary War drew to a close, Congress had sold , the last ship remaining in the Continental Navy due to a lack of funds to maintain the ship or support a navy. From 1785 until 1797, the United States' only armed maritime service was the Revenue Marine, founded in 1790 at the prompting of Secretary of the Treasury Alexander Hamilton. In 1785, two American merchant ships had been captured by the Muslim state of Algiers, and then Minister to France Thomas Jefferson began to urge the need for an American naval force to protect their passage through the Mediterranean. Jefferson's recommendations were initially met with indifference. However, Congress in 1786, and the Senate in 1791, discussed various proposals for a naval force, including estimates of costs for building frigates, but none were acted upon. Only in 1793, when Muslim pirates from Algiers had captured eleven additional merchant ships, was a proposal finally taken seriously.

A bill was presented to the House of Representatives on January 20, 1794, providing for the construction of four ships to carry forty-four guns each, and two ships to carry thirty-six guns each – by purchase or otherwise. The bill also provided pay and sustenance for naval officers, Marine officers, petty officers, sailors, and Marines, and outlined how each ship should be crewed in order to operate them. Opposition to the bill was strong and a clause was added that should peace be established with Algiers the construction of the ships was to cease.

Piracy had not been a problem when the American colonies were a part of the British Empire; the Royal Navy protected American vessels, since they belonged to subjects of the British Crown. After the American Revolutionary War, however, that protection was lost, and many foreign powers found that they could harass American merchant ships with impunity. Indeed, once the French Revolution started, Britain also started interdicting American merchant ships and there was little the fledgling American government could do about it. This was a major philosophical shift for the young Republic, many of whose leaders felt that a Navy would be too expensive to raise and maintain, and would unnecessarily provoke the European powers, in particular Great Britain. In the end, however, it was felt necessary to protect American interests at sea.

In March 1796, as construction of the frigates slowly progressed, a peace accord was announced between the United States and Algiers. In accordance with clause nine of the Naval Act of 1794, a clause that specifically directed that construction of the frigates be discontinued if peace was established, construction on all six ships was halted.

See also
History of the United States Navy

References

Bibliography
Abbot, Willis J. (1898). The Naval History of the United States. Volume One. New York, N.Y.: P.F. Collier.

This article incorporates public domain material from websites or documents of the United States Government.

External links

1794 in American law
United States Navy in the 18th century
United States federal defense and national security legislation
Presidency of George Washington
1794 in the United States
3rd United States Congress